Kimito is a former municipality of Finland. On January 1, 2009, it was consolidated with Dragsfjärd and Västanfjärd to form the new municipality of Kimitoön. Prior to the consolidation, it was one of the four municipalities located on Kimito island, the other three being Västanfjärd, Dragsfjärd and Halikko.

It is located in the province of Western Finland and is part of the Southwest Finland region. The municipality had a population of 3,301 (2004-12-31) and covered an area of 320.17 km2 (excluding sea) of which 2.29 km2 is inland water. The population density was 10.38 inhabitants per km2.

The municipality was bilingual, with majority being Swedish and minority Finnish speakers.

Events 
Kimito Island Music Festival
 Baltic Jazz Festival
 Norpas Festival
 mörkÖ Festival

Notable people 
 
 
 Niklas Hollsten (born 1983), Finnish freeride snowboarder

References

External links 

  – in Swedish and Finnish

Populated places disestablished in 2009
2009 disestablishments in Finland
Former municipalities of Finland
Kimitoön